Hari is a 2018 Nepalese film directed and written by Pratik Gurung and Safal K.C.. The film stars Bipin Karki in the lead role alongside Kamal Mani Nepal, Thinley Lhamo and Sunita Thakur. The film was released on 1 June 2018 in Nepal under the banner of Shubhalabh Film Production.

Plot 
Bishnu Hari (Bipin Karki), commonly known as Hari, is a strict religious man who is following rules set by his father, grandfathers and his strict mother known as Parvati. One day a bird excretes on him and then he starts looking for the answer of whether that was a blessing or a curse as he experiences fluctuating fortune in a series of events.

Cast 

 Bipin Karki as Bishnu Hari
 Kamal Mani Nepal as Hari's Adversary
 Sunita Thakur as Parvati
 Thinley Lhamo as Mystery Girl

Reception 
Bipin Karki, lead actor of the film told Kathmandu Post that Hari was one of the most important roles that he has played so far.

References

External links 
 
 Hari  on ReelNepal

2018 films
Nepalese drama films